Urman-Asty (Urmanaśtı) is a rural locality (a village) in Kukkuyanovsky Selsoviet, Dyurtyulinsky District, Bashkortostan, Russia. The population was 279 as of 2010. There are 6 streets.

Geography 
Urman-Asty is located 34 km south of Dyurtyuli (the district's administrative centre) by road. Ivachevo is the nearest rural locality.

References 

Rural localities in Dyurtyulinsky District